The 2010 Men's Hockey Hamburg Masters was the sixteenth edition of the Hamburg Masters, consisting of a series of test matches. It was held in Hamburg, Germany, from 1–4 July 2010, and featured four of the top nations in men's field hockey.

Competition format
The tournament featured the national teams of India, Japan, the Netherlands, and the hosts, Germany, competing in a round-robin format, with each team playing each other once. Three points were awarded for a win, one for a draw, and none for a loss.

Officials
The following umpires were appointed by the International Hockey Federation to officiate the tournament:

 Björn Bachmann (GER)
 Satoshi Kondo (JPN)
 Gurinder Singh Sangha (IND)
 Jonas van t' Hek (NED)
 Peter Wright (RSA)

Results
All times are local (Central European Summer Time).

Pool

Fixtures

Statistics

Final standings

Goalscorers

Reference

External links
Deutscher Hockey-Bund

2010
Men's
2010 in Dutch sport
2010 in German sport
2010 in Indian sport
2010 in Japanese sport
Sport in Hamburg
July 2010 sports events in Germany